Peter Eriksson may refer to:

Peter Eriksson (politician) (born 1958), spokesperson for the Swedish Green Party
Peter Eriksson (neuroscientist) (1959–2007), Swedish stem cell neuroscientist
Peter Eriksson (equestrian) (born 1959), Olympic medallist in equestrian events
Peter Eriksson (ice hockey) (born 1965), retired Swedish professional ice hockey left winger
Peter Eriksson (footballer) (born 1969), Swedish footballer
Peter Eriksson (coach) (born 1952), athletics coach
Peter Eriksson (curler) (born 1964), Swedish curler
Peter Eriksson (sailor) (born 1960), Swedish Olympic sailor
Peter Eriksson (snocross), Swedish Snocross racer, winner of 3 World Championships